Richard Dudley of Yanwath (1518-1593) was an English landowner involved in copper and silver mines in the north of England from 1570 onwards.

He was the eldest son of Thomas Dudley of Yanwath in Westmorland and Sarah Thirkeld, heiress of Yanwath Hall. Thomas Dudley was a member of the Sutton-Dudley family, a younger son of Edmund Sutton and Maud or Matilda, daughter of Lord Clifford.

In the 1550s Richard Dudley had a legal dispute with courtier Elizabeth Hutton, who was "mother of the maids" to Mary I of England. The case concerned the ownerership of a milldam on the River Eamont.

A justice of the peace, in January 1569 he arrested Thomas Bishop of Pocklington. Thomas Bishop was questioned at Yanwath for three days by the Bishop of Carlisle about the Duke of Norfolk and the Rising of the North.

Richard Dudley became the supervisor of the Keswick copper mines and smelting mills in 1570, as General Officer of the Queen's copper mines in Cumberland. He bought equipment to weigh and marked refined ore, and built a storehouse. As treasurer for the mining district he received ore worked by Daniel Hechstetter's German miners. From 1581 some technological impovements were trialled by Joachim Gans from Prague, who used methods outlined by Lazarus Ercker.

In April 1585 he was invited to meet commissioners for building a bridge at Rothay. He declined, giving the excuse that he had a horse in a race at Langwathby on the day. Elizabeth I was displeased by the negligence and apathy shown by the commission on the bridge project.

Richard Dudley married Dorothy, daughter of Edmund Sandford of Askham, Cumbria.

His younger brother John Dudley (died 1580) married Elizabeth Gardiner.

References

1518 births
1593 deaths